
The No 1 School of Military Aeronautics was a World War I training school for the Royal Flying Corps (RFC), based in Reading, England. It was formed in 1915 as an instructors college - but expanded in 1916 into a full RFC training school. In 1917 technical skills were separated and moved to a nearby airfield, Coley Park, as the School of Technical Training. All training at the school was on the ground; ranging from theoretical subjects through to practical training (e.g. taxiing and artillery observation).

History
In December 1915 the RFC commandeered buildings belonging to the University of Reading, at first for the purpose of training flight instructors. On 27 October 1916 the school was expanded to include cadet pilot and observer training, and designated No 1 School of Military Aeronautics (at the same time, No 2 school was opened in Oxford). The school's headquarters were in Yeomanry House, while most of the lessons were taught at Wantage Hall (a recently built hall of residence belonging to the University). Practical classes were held in Upper Redlands Road and nearby playing fields.

The school provided preliminary training for cadets and taught theoretical aspects of flight; including map reading, gunnery and mechanics. A small airfield was established at nearby Coley Park in around 1917. Technical trades were split off from the flight school, as the School of Technical Training, which operated from a jam factory adjoining the airfield. In September 1917 technical training was consolidated at Halton Camp, although Coley Park appears to have remained open for the rest of the war.

Many of the instructors were veterans of the Western Front. Still young men, they often struggled to teach the cadets who were of a similar age. For the observers the school had a room mocked up for artillery observation: a light-studded map was painted onto the floor and a mock fuselage hung from the ceiling.

Notable graduates
 Andrew Beauchamp-Proctor 
 Dudley Clarke (future World War II deception officer)
 Francis Howard Bickerton (Antarctic explorer)
 Ian Bonham-Carter (a senior World War II RAF officer)
 William Earl Johns (author of the Biggles books)

References

Bibliography
 
 
 
 
 
 
 

Aviation schools in the United Kingdom
Royal Flying Corps airfields
Military history of Berkshire
Military units and formations established in 1915
Military history of Reading, Berkshire
Military units and formations in Reading, Berkshire
Military units and formations in Berkshire
Royal Air Force stations in Berkshire